Great Hatfield is a village in the East Riding of Yorkshire, England in an area known as Holderness.

The village was a civil parish until 1935, when it was merged with Goxhill and Little Hatfield to form the parish of Hatfield.

In 1823 Great hatfield was in the civil parish of Mappleton and Sigglesthorne, and in the Wapentake and Liberty of Holderness. An "ancient stone cross of exquisite workmanship" was recorded at the village centre. There was a burial place but no place of worship. A previous chapel had burnt down a hundred years previously, although a stone, with the inscription "Here lieth the body of Expopher Constable, A.D. 642", marked its location. Population at the time was 127, with occupations including ten farmers, a grocer, a tailor, and a shoemaker. A carrier operated between the village and Hull once a week.

Great Hatfield was served from 1864 to 1964 by Sigglesthorne railway station on the Hull and Hornsea Railway. Landmarks include St Helen's Well, the Wrygarth Inn pub, and nearby 'Hatfield Paddock' football pitch adjacent to Densholme farm.

References

External links

Villages in the East Riding of Yorkshire
Holderness